Claudio Gora,  Emilio Giordana  (27 July 1913 – 13 March 1998) was an Italian actor and film director.

He was particularly prolific, making some 155 appearances in film and television over nearly 60 years (from 1939 to 1997). In the 1950s he did dabble with directing and screenwriting and directed the film Three Strangers in Rome in 1958 which was incidentally the first leading role by Claudia Cardinale. Some of his notable roles includes Adua e le compagne, directed by Antonio Pietrangeli, Tutti a casa by Luigi Comencini, and Dino Risi's  A Difficult Life and Il Sorpasso.

Selected filmography

 Torna, caro ideal! (1939) - Francesco Paolo Tosti
 Wealth Without a Future (1940) - Giovanni Di Cora
  (1940) - Il fidanzato della segretaria
 Il Bazar delle idee (1940)
 Love Me, Alfredo! (1940) - Il compositore Giacomo Varni
 Eternal Melodies (1940) - L'imperatore Giuseppe
 Amore imperiale (1941) - Alessio Romowski
 A Woman Has Fallen (1941) - Mario
 Document Z-3 (1942) - Paolo Sullich
 Quarta pagina (1942) - Claudio, l'avvocato
 Signorinette (1942) - Marco Lancia, lo scrittore
 Dove andiamo, signora? (1942) - Rudi Lindt, conte di Lerchmann
 Mater dolorosa (1943) - Giorgio della Valle
 L'amico delle donne (1943) - Il conte De Simerose
 La storia di una capinera (1943) - Nino Valentini
 National Velvet (1944) - Andrea
 Squadriglia Bianca (1944) - Alessandro, il pilota istruttore
 Resurrection (1944) - Dimitri Neklindoff
 Il fiore sotto gli occhi (1944) - Silvio Aroca
 Nessuno torna indietro (1945) - Andrea
 The Ten Commandments (1945) - (segment "Non dire falsa testimonianza")
 Il fabbro del convento (1945) - Des Measures
 I Met You in Naples (1946)
 The Models of Margutta (1946) - Andrea Saveri
 Trepidazione (1946)
 Fatal Symphony (1947)
 Preludio d'amore (1947) - Giovanni
 The Charterhouse of Parma (1948) - Le marquis Crescenzi
 Veglia nella notte (1948)
 L'isola di Montecristo (1948) - Dott. Paolo Fabbri
 I contrabbandieri del mare (1948) - Petropoulos
 The Enchanting Enemy (1953)
 Finishing School (1953) - Professor Charpentier
 Marie Antoinette Queen of France (1956) - Kreutz
 Il canto dell'emigrante (1956) - Il giudice
 The Goddess of Love (1957) - Armodio
 Tempest (1958) - Ministro di Caterine II
 The Facts of Murder (1959) - Il Marito
 Silver Spoon Set (1960) - Ridolfi
 Adua and Her Friends (1960) - Ercoli
 Via Margutta (1960) - Pippo Contigliani
 Sweet Deceptions (1960) - (scenes deleted)
 Everybody Go Home (1960) - Colonnello
 Love in Rome (1960) - Engineer Curtatoni
 Sword Without a Country (1961) - Duca di Belvarco
 A porte chiuse (1961) - Il presidente del tribunale
 Ghosts of Rome (1961) - Ingegner Tellandi
 Le Pavé de Paris (1961) - Agostino
 Gioventù di notte (1961) - Padre di Marco
 Les hommes veulent vivre (1961) - Rossi
 A Difficult Life (1961) - Commendator Bracci
 Ultimatum alla vita (1962) - Cap. Schneider
 Quattro notti con Alba (1962) - Colonel Spallafredda
 La Poupée (1962) - Guillermo Moren
 The Son of Spartacus (1962) - Crassus - governor of Egypt
 Swordsman of Siena (1962) - Leoni
 Il Sorpasso (1962) - Danilo Borelli 'Bibi'
 Mathias Sandorf (1963) - Procureur
 The Verona Trial (1963) - Cersosimo - Examining Magistrate
 Gidget Goes to Rome (1963) - Alberto
 The Swindlers (1963) - Spianelli (segment "Medico e fidanzata")
 Gibraltar (1964) - General Maxwell
 Il treno del sabato (1964) - Michele Pallante
 ...e la donna creò l'uomo (1964)
 The Secret of Dr. Mabuse (1964) - Direktor Botani / Dr. Mabuse
 Monsieur (1964) - Danon
 Via Veneto (1964)
 White Voices (1964) - Marchionne
 My Wife (1964) - The Honourable (segment "Eritrea")
 Cover Girls (1964) - Luciano Fraschetti
 Le conseguenze (1964)
 Destination Miami: Objective Murder (1964)
 Uncle Tom's Cabin (1965) - (uncredited)
 I complessi (1965) - The Antique Dealer (segment "Il Complesso della Schiava nubiana")
 Made in Italy (1965) - Bored Diner's Husband (segment "1 'Usi e costumi', episode 1")
 Gli uomini dal passo pesante (1965) - Fred Wickett
 An Angel for Satan (1966) - Conte Montebruno
 I nostri mariti (1966) - The Doctor at the Hospital (segment "Il Marito di Roberta")
 Le Saint prend l'affût (1966) - Cesare Pavone
 Gli amori di Angelica (1966)
 The Hellbenders (1967) - Reverend Pierce
 The Million Dollar Countdown (1967) - Proprietario del Yacht
 John the Bastard (1967) - Don Diego Tenorio
 Danger: Diabolik (1968) - Police Chief
 Be Sick... It's Free (1968) - The Primary
 L'età del malessere (1968)
 Catch As Catch Can (1968) - Cabinet Minister
 Temptation (1969) - Cesare Veraldi
 Zingara (1969) - Camillo Ricci
 The Five Man Army (1969) - Esteban
 Il Prof. Dott. Guido Tersilli, primario della clinica Villa Celeste, convenzionata con le mutue (1969) - Prof. De Amatis
 Dead End (1969) - Montenegro
 Safety Catch (1969) - Le docteur Carrua
 Strogoff (1970) - General Dubelt
 Io non spezzo... rompo (1971) - Frank Mannata
 Confessions of a Police Captain (1971) - District Attorney Malta
 Equinozio (1971) - Il padre di Stefano
 We Are All in Temporary Liberty (1971) - Foreign Office manager
 Le belve (1971) - Giulio Bianchi (segment "Il caso Apposito")
 Non commettere atti impuri (1971) - Giacomo
 Seven Blood-Stained Orchids (1972) - Raffaele Ferri
 Shadows Unseen (1972) - District Attorney
 Valerie Inside Outside (1972) - 'Barone'
 Rosina Fumo viene in città... per farsi il corredo (1972) - Father of Francesco
 The Nun and the Devil (1973) - Cardinal d'Arezzo
 Hospitals: The White Mafia (1973) - Prof. Calogeri
 The Great Kidnapping (1973) - Samperi
 Mean Frank and Crazy Tony (1973) - Director of 'Casa del Giovane'
 Provaci anche tu Lionel (1973)
 Buona parte di Paolina (1973)
 Ante Up (1974) - Doctor Ferri
 How to Kill a Judge (1975) - Film Actor Playing State Prosecutor
 Silent Action (1975) - Martinetti
 Section spéciale (1975) - Francis Villette, le premier président de la cour d'appel
 Manhunt in the City (1975) - Attorney Ludovico Mieli
 La guerre du pétrole n'aura pas lieu (1975) - Stockell
 The Flower in His Mouth (1975) - Deputate Cataudella
 The Sunday Woman (1975) - Garrone
 The Net (1975) - Carlo Vanetti
 The Diamond Peddlers (1976) - Mr. Robinson
 Don Milani (1976) - Don Bensi
 A Man Called Magnum (1977) - Don Domenico Laurenzi
 La belva col mitra (1977) - Judge
 The Perfect Crime (1978)
 Lion of the Desert (1980) - President of Court
 I Know That You Know That I Know (1982) - Ronconi
 Count Tacchia (1982) - Duca Savello
 Amok (1983) - M. Horn
 Sono un fenomeno paranormale (1985)
 Piccole stelle (1988)
 Ombre d'amore (1990) - Daniele, l'attore
 Rossini! Rossini! (1991) - Dott. Bardos
 Vacanze di Natale '91 (1991) - Onorevele Mariotti

External links

1913 births
1998 deaths
Actors from Genoa
Italian male film actors
Italian film directors
Nastro d'Argento winners
20th-century Italian male actors